Pieces of eight were Spanish coins.

Pieces of Eight may refer to
Pieces of Eight, an album by Styx 1978 
Pieces of Eight (Don Ellis Octet album), live album recorded 1967, released 2006
Pieces of Eight (1959 revue), London, with sketches by Peter Cook
Pieces of Eight (1985 musical), Edmonton, music by Jule Styne
Pieces of Eight (plays), 8 one-act plays presented in 1982-1983, by Tom Stoppard and 7 other dramatists
Pieces of Eight, shop on New Orleans Square Disneyland
Pieces of Eight: The Monetary Powers and Disabilities of the United States Constitution by Edwin Vieira ,

Film and TV
Pieces of Eight, 1956 BBC TV children's movie with Michael Caridia and other child actors 
Pieces of Eight, 1957 Season 1 Episode 2 of The Adventures of Long John Silver 
Pieces of Eight, Season 5 Episode 8 of Davey and Goliath (1960)
Pieces of Eight, 1977 Season 1 Episode 3 of Eight Is Enough  
Pieces of Eight, 2003 Season 4 Episode 2 of Andromeda (TV series)
Pieces of Eight, 2013 Season 1 Episode 15 of Swashbuckle (TV series)
Pieces of Eight, 2016 Season 2 Episode 9 of The Coroner (TV series)